Stephen Sang is a Kenyan lawyer and politician who currently serves as the second Governor of Nandi County in Kenya. He previously served as Senator for Nandi County from 2013 to 2017.

Early life and education 
Stephen Kipyego Sang was born on 1 January 1985. He attended Kapsabet High School in Nandi County, and the University of Nairobi, where he graduated with Bachelor of Laws in the year 2008.

Electoral history 
On August 8, 2017 Sang was elected as the youngest Governor in Kenya at 32, since the adoption of the devolved system in 2010. In 2013 he had also made history when he was elected the youngest Senator at 28 in Kenya's inaugural Senate.
Sang has recently been at the forefront in condemning drug trafficking in the country terming some politicians beneficiaries of the trade.

References 

Members of the Senate of Kenya
County Governors of Kenya
21st-century Kenyan lawyers
University of Nairobi alumni
1985 births
Living people
United Democratic Alliance (Kenya) politicians